Samuel Crawford (April 15, 1892 – date of death unknown) was an American pitcher and manager in baseball's Negro leagues.

Born in Dallas, Texas, he played in the pre-Negro leagues for the Chicago American Giants off and on from 1914 to 1917, and became a pitcher and eventually manager of the Kansas City Monarchs and J. L. Wilkinson's barnstorming farm-league team All Nations in 1923. He was known for combining a strong fastball with a knuckleball.

Crawford left Wilkinson's teams in February 1924 to manage the Birmingham Black Barons.

Post-playing career
Crawford opened up a news stand, after he left baseball, and made the news in 1955 after he was involved in a shooting. He allegedly shot and killed Pete William DeGraw, telling police that DeGraw came at him in a threatening fashion. Crawford fired shots at DeGraw's friend, who Crawford said had a knife.

References

External links
 and Baseball-Reference Black Baseball stats and Seamheads
 

All Nations players
Cleveland Tigers (baseball) players
Kansas City Monarchs players
Dayton Marcos players
Negro league baseball managers
Baseball players from Dallas
1892 births
Year of death missing
Baseball pitchers